Marquefave is a commune in the Haute-Garonne department in southwestern France.

Geography
The village lies on the banks of the Garonne river.

The commune is bordered by five other communes: Capens across the river Garonne and the land border to the north, Montaut to the northwest, Montgazin to the east, Lacaugne to the south, and finally by Carbonne across the river Garonne to the west.

Population

See also
Communes of the Haute-Garonne department

References

Communes of Haute-Garonne